The Calgary Wranglers are a professional ice hockey team based in Calgary, that began play in the 2022–23 American Hockey League (AHL) season. The team plays at the Scotiabank Saddledome, the home of their NHL affiliate team, the Calgary Flames.

History
On August 2, 2022, the team announced its name, bringing back the "Wranglers" moniker used by the WHL team of the same name from 1977 to 1987. On May 23, 2022, the Calgary Flames announced the relocation of the Stockton Heat to Calgary. The Flames wanted their AHL affiliate team to be closer to their home. The Wranglers played their first game on October 16, 2022, a 6–5 loss against the Coachella Valley Firebirds.

Current roster
Updated March 16, 2023.

|}

References

External links
 

Calgary Wranglers
American Hockey League teams
Calgary Flames minor league affiliates
Ice hockey teams in Calgary
Ice hockey clubs established in 2022
2022 establishments in Alberta
Calgary Sports and Entertainment